The women's 3000 metres steeplechase event at the 2019 Summer Universiade was held on 11 July at the Stadio San Paolo in Naples.

Results

References

3000
2019